Canopy is a digital health company, established in 2010 and headquartered in New York, NY.  Its technologies focus on bridging the linguistic and cultural barrier between healthcare providers and their limited English proficiency, or non-English speaking patients.

History 
First-generation Chinese-American Bill Tan founded New York City-based Canopy in 2015, after he made experiences with translating for his immigrant family-members during hospital visiting.

Corporate affairs

Leadership 
Canopy Innovations is managed by Chairman Bill Tan. Another key executives are:

 Jason Martin, chief executive officer
 Chris Pappas, VP of Sales
 Justin Jackson, Head of Product Dev

Products and services 
Canopy helps to overcome language barriers between healthcare providers and patients. The language barrier undermines the quality of care for 27+ million patients, and creates enormous workflow and financial constraints to the health delivery organizations that serve them.  With support from the National Institutes of Health (NIH), Canopy has developed a unique suite of products to tackle these challenges.

Canopy offers Canopy Learn, an eLearning course which for healthcare providers, professionals and students to learn Medical Spanish.

Canopy also offers the application Canopy Speak, which offers pre-translated medical phases in 15 languages, including Chinese, Arabic and Spanish. The app also allows calling external interpretive services.

Some adopters of its software include Duke University Health System, UNC Health Care, the Visiting Nurse Service of New York, the University of Pennsylvania Health System, Jefferson Health, Elmhurst Hospital, UCLA David Geffen School of Medicine, and University of Arizona College of Medicine.

Awards 
In 2014, Canopy won the PILOT Health Tech NYC award and innovation awards from the National Institute of Health.

References

External links 
official website

Software companies of the United States
Health information technology companies
Software companies based in New York City